The following television stations operate on virtual channel 20 in the United States:

 K02QI-D in Hesperus, Colorado
 K02RL-D in Indio, California
 K09XL-D in Douglas, Wyoming
 K11UW-D in Akron, Colorado
 K14RW-D in Grants Pass, Oregon
 K16NH-D in Wray, Colorado
 K20DN-D in Wichita Falls, Texas
 K20HB-D in Billings, Montana
 K20IM-D in Barstow, California
 K20IT-D in Boise City, Oklahoma
 K20JS-D in Glasgow, Montana
 K20KJ-D in Bryan, Texas
 K20KV-D in Medford, Oregon
 K20KW-D in Saint Cloud, Minnesota
 K20LP-D in St. James, Minnesota
 K20LQ-D in Yakima, Washington
 K20OL-D in Fort Smith, Arkansas
 K20OO-D in Ceres, California
 K20PB-D in Williston, North Dakota
 K21OM-D in Lafayette, Louisiana
 K22MD-D in Anderson/Central Valley, California
 K24EZ-D in Idalia, Colorado
 K25QT-D in Columbia, Missouri
 K26PQ-D in Oroville, California
 K28FW-D in Peetz, Colorado
 K28IX-D in Pleasant Valley, Colorado
 K30HA-D in Yuma, Colorado
 K36IH-D in Ignacio, Colorado
 K38AC-D in Alexandria, Minnesota
 KADF-LD in Austin, Texas
 KBOP-LD in Dallas-Fort Worth, Texas
 KCVU in Paradise, California
 KEFN-CD in St. Louis, Missouri
 KFKY-LD in Springfield, Missouri
 KFLU-LD in Fayetteville, Arkansas
 KFNB in Casper, Wyoming
 KIKU in Honolulu, Hawaii
 KLML in Grand Junction, Colorado
 KLML-LD in Grand Junction, Colorado
 KLRA-CD in Little Rock, Arkansas
 KNLA-CD in Los Angeles, California
 KNMQ-LD in Albuquerque, New Mexico
 KOFY-TV in San Francisco, California
 KOXI-CD in Portland, Oregon
 KQRE-LD in Bend, Oregon
 KRMU in Durango, Colorado
 KRTX-LP in San Antonio, Texas
 KSMN in Worthington, Minnesota
 KSZG-LD in Aspen, Colorado
 KTBW-TV in Tacoma, Washington
 KTMW in Salt Lake City, Utah
 KTSH-CD in Shreveport, Louisiana
 KTVD in Denver, Colorado
 KTXH in Houston, Texas
 KUKC-LD in Kansas City, Missouri
 KVME-TV in Bishop, California
 KWKB in Iowa City, Iowa
 KWYF-LD in Casper, Wyoming
 KZTN-LD in Boise, Idaho
 W14EU-D in Tallahassee, Florida
 W20DL-D in Macon, Georgia
 W20DT-D in Vanderbilt, Michigan
 W20DX-D in Panama City, Florida
 W20DY-D in Roanoke, West Virginia
 W20EM-D in New Bern, North Carolina
 W20ER-D in Bangor, Maine
 W20EV-D in Houghton Lake, Michigan
 W20EY-D in Wilmington, North Carolina
 W29ET-D in Coloma, Wisconsin
 W32FE-D in Hartwell & Royston, Georgia
 WARP-CD in Tampa-St. Petersburg, Florida
 WBBH-TV in Fort Myers, Florida
 WBII-CD in Holly Springs, Mississippi
 WBSE-LD in Charleston, South Carolina
 WBXX-TV in Crossville, Tennessee
 WCCT-TV in Waterbury, Connecticut
 WCES-TV in Wrens, Georgia
 WCGZ-LD in Lanett, Alabama
 WCJB-TV in Gainesville, Florida
 WCOV-TV in Montgomery, Alabama
 WCWG in Lexington, North Carolina
 WDCA in Washington, D.C.
 WFYI in Indianapolis, Indiana
 WFYI-LD in Indianapolis, Indiana
 WHNO in New Orleans, Louisiana
 WHRM-TV in Wausau, Wisconsin
 WICS in Springfield, Illinois
 WIMN-CD in Arecibo, Puerto Rico
 WKPV in Ponce, Puerto Rico
 WLWD-LD in Dayton, Ohio
 WMYD in Detroit, Michigan
 WNGJ-LD in Ogdensburg, New York
 WOUB-TV in Athens, Ohio
 WQDI-LD in Canton, Ohio
 WSJN-CD in San Juan, Puerto Rico
 WTSN-CD in Evansville, Indiana
 WUTR in Utica, New York
 WUWB-LD in West Branch, Michigan
 WVTB in St. Johnsbury, Vermont
 WWHC-LD in Olean, New York
 WWLM-CD in Washington, Pennsylvania

The following stations, which are no longer licensed, formerly operated on virtual channel 20:
 K20KI-D in Rapid City, South Dakota
 K25LT-D in Cortez, Colorado
 K27EE-D in Ukiah, California
 KAKH-LD in Lufkin, Texas
 WCZC-LD in Augusta, Georgia
 WDUE-LD in Eau Claire, Wisconsin
 WDZA-LD in Wilmington, North Carolina
 WOTH-CD in Cincinnati, Ohio
 WYCC in Chicago, Illinois

References

20 virtual